The 2007 Bahrain Grand Prix (formally the 2007 Formula 1 Gulf Air Bahrain Grand Prix) was a Formula One motor race was the third race of the 2007 FIA Formula One World Championship. It was held on 15 April at the Bahrain International Circuit in Sakhir, Bahrain.

In practice 1 and 2, Kimi Räikkönen topped the charts. Lewis Hamilton also placed well. Vitantonio Liuzzi got a surprise 8th-place result in 1st practice. Felipe Massa won the Grand Prix from Lewis Hamilton, who made history to become the first driver ever to finish on the podium in all his first three races.

Report

Practice
The Friday morning practice session saw both Ferraris top the time sheets with Kimi Räikkönen the fastest with a time of 1:33.162 with his teammate, Felipe Massa, just over half a second slower than the Finn in second. The Italian team's nearest competition was the two McLarens of Lewis Hamilton and Fernando Alonso who were third and fourth respectively, Hamilton just under a second slower than Räikkönen's time.

Räikkönen was fastest again in the afternoon session, clocking a time of 1:33.527, just under four tenths slower than his fastest time during the morning session. Unlike the morning session, however, Ferrari did not have both their cars occupying the top two as Massa's fastest time was fourth fastest, with Hamilton and BMW Sauber's Robert Kubica separating the two Ferraris.

It was six thousandths of a second that prevented Räikkönen from being fastest in all three practice sessions, but his run was ended by Lewis Hamilton with the lead BMW Sauber of Nick Heidfeld in third; Kubica fourth; Anthony Davidson's Super Aguri in fifth and Massa completing the top six, four tenths down on Hamilton's time.

Qualifying
Qualifying was played out in temperatures of over 34 °C and despite a small shower of rain just after the morning practice session was over, the track itself was dry. Williams' Alexander Wurz was the first out onto the circuit with former Williams drivers David Coulthard and Jenson Button following him. Like the first practice session on Friday, the two Ferraris set the early pace, both recording laps under 1:33.000, the only two cars to do so during Part One of Qualifying. The first six to be eliminated from qualifying were Takuma Sato, who was seventeen thousandths of a second slower than sixteenth place Jenson Button; both Toro Rossos of Liuzzi and Speed; both Spykers of Albers and Sutil and David Coulthard joined Albers at the back of grid after his Red Bull suffered a gearbox problem.

The two Toyotas of Ralf Schumacher and Jarno Trulli left the pits first for Part Two of qualifying. Like in the first session, Ferrari were setting the pace, this time however it was Massa who was leading the way, with both their drivers setting times under 1:32:000, only to be split to Hamilton's McLaren. Button, who only just made the cut for the second round of qualifying, was slowest in the session, over two seconds slower than Massa's time. Joining the Brit was fellow Honda driver Rubens Barrichello; Ralf Schumacher; Davidson; Heikki Kovalainen and Wurz.

Hamilton and the two BMW Saubers were first out in the final Part of qualifying, with Massa setting the early pace. The final part of the session saw Massa improve his time, lapping with a time of 1:32.652. Hamilton came second, just under three tenths slower than Massa, putting him on the front row in his third Formula One race. Kimi Räikkönen and Fernando Alonso made up row two, both BMW Saubers of Heidfeld and Kubica were fifth and sixth respectively; Giancarlo Fisichella and Mark Webber made up row four and Jarno Trulli and Nico Rosberg completed the top ten ninth and tenth respectively.

Race 

At the start, the two leaders maintained their positions with Alonso passing Räikkönen into the second corner to take third. Further back, Adrian Sutil, Jenson Button and Scott Speed were involved in a collision in turn four, with Button and Speed out on the spot, while Sutil managed to get back to the pits. The Safety Car was brought out to clear up the wreckage.

Vitantonio Liuzzi had a drive-through penalty on lap nine for overtaking under a safety car. On the same lap, Rosberg had an off-track excursion, losing a place to Coulthard in the process. The front two stayed in the same positions after the first round of stops, but Räikkönen got back past Alonso to take third.

Alonso began to lose ground, and was passed by Heidfeld. He stayed behind the BMW for the remainder of the race. The Renaults also began to struggle, with Coulthard managing to overtake Fisichella. However, both Red Bulls retired in quick succession, promoting Trulli and Fisichella to the points.

Massa won the Grand Prix, 2.3 seconds in front of rookie Hamilton.

After the race, Alonso, Räikkönen and Hamilton were equal on points. The last time the top three were level on points was in 1950 after the Indianapolis 500. By finishing second, Hamilton became the first driver in Formula One history to finish on the podium in each of his first three World Championship Grands Prix; the previous record was two consecutive podium finishes, achieved by Peter Arundell in the 1964 season.

Classification

Qualifying

Race

Championship standings after the race 

Drivers' Championship standings

Constructors' Championship standings

Note: Only the top five positions are included for both sets of standings.

See also
 2007 Bahrain GP2 Series round

References

External links

 Bahrain Grand Prix results (fia.com)
 Detailed Bahrain Grand Prix results

Bahrain Grand Prix
Bahrain Grand Prix
Grand Prix
Bahrain Grand Prix